Gatlinburg–Pigeon Forge Airport  is a county-owned public-use municipal airport in Sevier County, Tennessee, United States. The airport is well north of the cities of Gatlinburg and Pigeon Forge, but only two nautical miles (3.7 km) southeast of the central business district of Sevierville, and within its city limits.

Facilities and aircraft 
It has one runway designated 10/28 with an asphalt surface measuring 5,506 by 75 feet (1,678 x 23 m).

For the 12-month period ending April 30, 2008, the airport had 70,780 aircraft operations, an average of 193 per day: 92% general aviation, 7% air taxi and 1% military. At that time there were 102 aircraft based at this airport: 77% single-engine, 14% multi-engine, 7% jet and 2% helicopter.

References

External links 
 Aerial photo as of 16 March 1992 from USGS The National Map
 
 

Airports in Tennessee
Buildings and structures in Sevier County, Tennessee
Transportation in Sevier County, Tennessee